In enzymology, a pseudouridine kinase is an enzyme that catalyzes the chemical reaction

ATP + pseudouridine  ADP + pseudouridine 5'-phosphate

Thus, the two substrates of this enzyme are ATP and pseudouridine, whereas its two products are ADP and pseudouridine 5'-phosphate.

This enzyme belongs to the family of transferases, specifically those transferring phosphorus-containing groups (phosphotransferases) with an alcohol group as acceptor.  The systematic name of this enzyme class is ATP:pseudouridine 5'-phosphotransferase. This enzyme is also called pseudouridine kinase (phosphorylating).  This enzyme participates in pyrimidine metabolism.

References

 

EC 2.7.1
Enzymes of unknown structure